Philip Godwyn (died 1574) was the member of the Parliament of England for Marlborough for the parliament of 1571. He was also mayor of Marlborough.

References 

Members of Parliament for Marlborough
English MPs 1571
1574 deaths
Year of birth unknown
Mayors of Marlborough